Mario Marques (born 15 May 1909, date of death unknown) was a Brazilian sprinter. He competed in the men's 100 metres at the 1932 Summer Olympics.

References

1909 births
Year of death missing
Athletes (track and field) at the 1932 Summer Olympics
Brazilian male sprinters
Olympic athletes of Brazil
Place of birth missing